Half-A-Dollar-Bill is a surviving 1924 American silent drama film directed by W. S. Van Dyke and starring Anna Q. Nilsson. It was produced by an independent company and released through Metro Pictures.

Plot
As described in a film magazine review, Captain Duncan McTeague, ashore in Southport, finds a deserted baby boy with a note and half of a dollar bill pinned to its clothing. The note states that the mother hopes some day to return and identify the child with the other half of the dollar bill. McTeague raises the child. When he is four years old, the captain discharges his mate Martin Webber, who seeks revenge by kidnapping the boy. A woman turns up who proves to be the missing mother. Webber is killed and the mother and Captain McTeague are united.

Cast

Preservation
A copy of Half-A-Dollar-Bill is held by the Cinematheque Royale de Belgique.

References

External links

 
 
 Australian daybill; long poster
 Another poster version

1924 films
American silent feature films
Films directed by W. S. Van Dyke
Metro Pictures films
1924 drama films
Silent American drama films
American black-and-white films
1920s American films
1920s English-language films